The 2006 Oklahoma gubernatorial election was held on November 7, 2006. Incumbent Democratic Governor Brad Henry won re-election to a second term in a landslide, defeating Republican U.S. Representative Ernest Istook. Henry took 66.5% of the vote to Istook's 33.5% and swept all but three counties in the state.

, this remains the last time that a Democrat has been elected Governor of Oklahoma, or, along with the concurrent elections, won any statewide office. The GOP would make enormous gains at the state level just four years later, flipping every single statewide executive office from the Democrats, and gaining unified control of state government for the first time in history.

Background
Though Democrats had dominated state politics for most of Oklahoma's history, the Oklahoma Republican Party had recently gained control of the Oklahoma House of Representatives and held five of the state's six Congressional seats. Henry's opponent, Republican Ernest Istook, was a member of the United States House of Representatives, representing Oklahoma's 5th congressional district.

As in many Southern states, Oklahoma has favored conservative Democrats to the more liberal members of the party. In his first term, Henry had supported some tax cuts and took centrist positions on many political hot button issues.

Democratic primary

Candidates
Brad Henry, incumbent Governor of Oklahoma
Andrew W. Marr, Jr.

Results

Republican primary

Candidates
Ernest Istook, U.S. Congressman
Bob Sullivan, former Oklahoma Secretary of Energy
James A. Williamson, Oklahoma State Senator
Jim Evanoff

Campaign
Istook's strongest opponent in the primary was Bob Sullivan, who positioned himself as the only "non-career politician" in the race. He ran ads featuring Gailard Sartain that attacked his opponents' "career politician" background. The Sartain ads were seen as over the top and may have hurt his chances. Sullivan said education was a top priority and had led an effort to place an initiative petition on the November 2006 ballot that would have required 65 percent of money earmarked for education be spent in the classroom.

Results

General election
The incumbent Democratic Governor Brad Henry won the election with more than 66 percent of the vote, beating Republican U.S. Representative Ernest Istook.

Predictions

Polling

Results

See also
 2006 United States gubernatorial elections

References

External links
Official campaign websites (Archived)
 Brad Henry 2006 Gubernatorial Campaign Site
 Ernest Istook 2006 Gubernatorial Campaign Site
  Oklahoma State Election Board, primary results
 Bob Sullivan 2006 Gubernatorial Campaign Site
 Jim Williamson 2006 Gubernatorial Campaign Site

2006
Gubernatorial
2006 United States gubernatorial elections